The K Eighth Avenue Local, earlier the AA, was a rapid transit service of the New York City Subway. Its route bullet was colored  on station signs, car rollsigns, and the official subway map since it ran on the IND Eighth Avenue Line.

The K operated during midday, evenings, and weekends, making local stops between 168th Street in Washington Heights, Manhattan and World Trade Center in Lower Manhattan via Central Park West and Eighth Avenue in Manhattan. During late night hours, the A express made local stops on the IND Eighth Avenue Line. It was discontinued in 1988 as part of a series of major service changes.

History

Service as the AA

 and AA service began on September 10, 1932 with the opening of the IND Eighth Avenue Line. The Independent Subway System (IND) used single letters to refer to express services and double letters for local services. The  ran express and the AA ran local, from 168th Street to Hudson Terminal (now World Trade Center). The AA ran at all times, and it was extended to 207th Street during nights and on Sundays when the  did not run. When the Eighth Avenue Line was extended to Jay Street–Borough Hall on February 1, 1933 the AA was extended there evenings and Sundays, when the  did not run.

On July 1, 1933, the AA was suspended when the Concourse Line opened and the new  service provided local service on Eighth Avenue in its place. A service began running express in Manhattan at all times. AA service was restored as part of changes made in conjunction with the opening of the IND Sixth Avenue Line on December 15, 1940. The AA would  only run during non-rush hours and Saturday late afternoon through all day Sunday service to Chambers Street. Rush hours, which at the time included Saturday mornings and afternoons, the AA did not run; it was replaced by the BB (later ) service, which instead ran on the Sixth Avenue Line. On January 5, 1952, AA service began operating during Saturday mornings and afternoons, replacing BB service. This pattern was unchanged until August 28, 1977, when late night service was replaced by an all local  service.

Service as the K

On May 6, 1985, as part of the elimination of double letters, the AA was renamed the K. This service operated between 168th Street and World Trade Center during midday, evenings, and weekends. During late night hours, the A express made local stops on the Eighth Avenue Line. This change was not officially reflected in schedules until May 24, 1987.

On December 11, 1988, as part of the widespread service changes that day, the K was discontinued, being replaced by the  train, which was expanded from its rush-hour only service to include midday service between 145th Street and Euclid Avenue, early evening (until 9 p.m.) service from 145th Street to World Trade Center, and weekend service matching the former K between 168th Street and World Trade Center. The  was also expanded to middays to match part of the former K.

Final route

Service pattern 
The following table shows the lines used by the K service:

Stations 

For a more detailed station listing, see the articles on the lines listed above.

References 

1988 disestablishments
Defunct New York City Subway services